The 2004 NCAA Division I Women's Golf Championships were contested at the 23rd annual NCAA-sanctioned golf tournament to determine the individual and team national champions of women's Division I collegiate golf in the United States.

The tournament was held at the Auburn Golf Course in Auburn, Alabama.

UCLA won the team championship, the Bruins' second and first since 1991.

Sarah Huarte, from California, won the individual title.

Individual results

Individual champion
 Sarah Huarte, California (278, −10)

Team leaderboard

 DC = Defending champion
 Debut appearance

References

NCAA Women's Golf Championship
Golf in Alabama
NCAA Women's Golf Championship
NCAA Women's Golf Championship
NCAA Women's Golf Championship